Jaya Sri Maha Bodhi  is a historical sacred bo tree (Ficus religiosa) in the Mahamewuna Garden in historical city of Anuradhapura, Sri Lanka. This is believed to be a tree grown from a cutting of the southern branch from the historical sacred bo tree, Sri Maha Bodhi, which was destroyed during Emperor Ashoka the Great time, at Buddha Gaya in India, under which Siddhartha Gautama (Buddha) attained Enlightenment. The Buddhist nun Sangamitta Maha Theri, a daughter of Indian Emperor Ashoka, in 288 BC,  brought the tree cutting to Sri Lanka during the reign of Sinhalese King Devanampiya Tissa.[1] At more than 2,300 years old, it is the oldest living human-planted tree in the world with a known planting date. The Mahavamsa, or the great chronicle of the Sinhalese, provides an elaborate account of the establishment of the Jaya Siri Maha Bodhi on the Island and the subsequent development of the site as a major Buddhist pilgrimage site.

Today, the Jaya Siri Maha Bodhi is situated on a high terrace, about 6.5 meters above the ground, and surrounded by 4 other lower-level terraces with Bo trees called “Parivara Bodhi” planted for its protection. The site is currently administered by the Chief High Priest of Atamasthana and the Atamasthana Palakasabha, the administrative body of the Atamasthana, and receives millions of pilgrims each year. The site is open to visitors and continuously hosts numerous acts of worship throughout the year. However, access to the uppermost terrace where the bo tree is located is restricted due to the old age of the tree and various acts of vandalism it has endured throughout history, including a terrorist attack by LTTE in 1985, where around 146 pilgrims were massacred.

History
The Jaya Sri Maha Bodhi is a sacred Bo tree, that stands in the Mahamewna Gardens in Anuradhapura, Sri Lanka. Not only is it the closest authentic living link to Gautama Buddha, it is also the oldest human-planted tree in the world with a known planting date and a recorded history.

About 2,600 years ago, Lord Gautama Buddha sat with his back against an Esathu tree on the banks of the Neranjana River in Bodhgaya, India. It was at this moment, as he sat against the tree, that the Buddha is said to have achieved enlightenment. In doing so, the tree also gained a venerated status. It became known as the Bodhi tree, and pilgrims came to see it even within the lifetime of the Buddha.

Later, in 236 BC, the Buddhist nun Sanghamitta Maha Theri was sent by Emperor Asoka from India to Sri Lanka. With her, she carried a southern branch of the original sacred fig. This branch was ceremoniously presented to Devanampiya Tissa, one of the earliest kings of Sri Lanka whose reign was notable for the arrival of Buddhism. In 288 BC, Tissa planted the branch of the Bodhi tree in his Royal Park in Anuradhapura.

The Jaya Sri Maha Bodhi, as it became known, has since been cared for and protected by Buddhist monks and dedicated kings. Statues, water canals, golden fences, and walls have been built around the tree over the centuries, and many vows and offerings have been made by Buddhists at the foot of the sacred fig.

At times the tree has faced serious threats, and not only from wild elephants. Two storms in 1907 and 1911 resulted in broken branches. A vandal attacked the tree in 1929, hacking off another branch. In 1985, Tamil Tiger separatists stormed the site and massacred 146 Sinhalese-Buddhists on the upper terrace.

Religious and social significance

Buddhists on the Island have had a practice of visiting and paying homage to the most sacred Bodhi tree. It is an annual custom for pilgrims from far-away villages to visit the city of Anuradhapura and to pay homage to the Sri Maha Bodhi. The caretaker of this site provides various offerings on a daily basis. The Buddhists in general have a strong belief that offerings made to the Jaya Sri Maha Bodhi have produced significant and positive changes in their life. It has also been customary for many Buddhists to make a special vow before the Jaya Sri Maha Bodhi for the safe delivery of their babies without malformations and for many other cures. It has also been a long tradition among farmers around Anuradhapura to offer the Sri Maha Bodhi tree the rice prepared from their first paddy harvest. They strongly believe that such offerings lead to a sustained paddy production with the least sufferings from drought as well as pest attacks, including elephant damage.

Significance

In the 3rd century BC, it was brought to Sri Lanka by Sangamitta Theri (Pali; Skt.: Sanghamitra), the daughter of Emperor Asoka and founder of an order of Buddhist nuns in Sri Lanka.

Contributions

Several ancient kings have contributed in developing this religious site.  King Vasabha (65 - 107 AD) placed four Buddha statues in four side of the sacred tree.  King Voharika Tissa (214 - 236 AD) added metallic statues.  King Mahanaga (569 - 571 AD) constructed a water canal around the sacred tree and King Sena II (846 - 866 AD) renovated it.

The present wall was constructed by Ilupandeniye Athtadassi Thero during the reign of King Kirti Sri Rajasinha (r. 1747-1782), to protect it from wild elephants which might have damaged the tree.

The first golden fence around the sacred tree was constructed by some Buddhist followers in Kandy under the guidance of Yatirawana Narada Thero in 1969.  The iron fence below the above golden fence was created by people of Gonagala under the guidance of Yagirala Pannananda Thero.

Ancient statues
Two statues of Buddha can be seen in the image-house; a stone-standing-statue is in the right side of the stone wall.  The cobra-stone is a very rare creation, showing the embossed figure of cobra.  Several monolith heads with plain incisions are in this religious site.

The Principal Buddha of the Śrī Mahā Bodhi Shrine
The largest – and also in other aspects the most spectacular – stone image of a seated Buddha in Sri Lanka is located since about the sixth century on the premises of the Śrī Mahā Bodhi Shrine at the Mahāvihāra complex at Anurādhapura. The statue is carved out of a single slab of dolomite marble, measures 3.3 metres in height and is since 1911 installed in the image-house located east of the sacred Bodhi-tree. This Buddha is presumably the only known Sri Lankan Buddha seated in the “diamond posture” (vajraparyaṅkāsana) with both soles pointing upwards, and displaying the gesture of touching the earth (bhūmisparśa-mudrā or māravijaya-mudrā). All other seated Sri Lankan Buddhas usually rest in the “noble posture” (sattvaparyaṅkāsana) with the right leg placed upon the left leg with only the sole of the right foot visible, displaying instead the gesture of meditation with both hands placed in the lap (dhyāna-mudrā). The gesture of touching the earth (bhūmisparśa-mudrā) symbolizes Buddha Siddhartha’s defeat of Māra (māravijaya) and subsequent enlightenment under the Bodhi-tree at Bodhgayā (Gayā district, Bihar, N.-E. India). The only known Sri Lankan Buddha image displaying the bhūmisparśa-mudrā is thus fittingly placed beside the principal Bodhi-tree of Sri Lanka located at the Mahāvihāra complex. This Buddha was commissioned to be installed in the Śrī Mahā Bodhi Shrine and likely copied after an early North-Eastern Indian Pāla style image. Faxian, the Chinese pilgrim, left the following account of his visit to the Śrī Mahā Bodhi Shrine during his stay in Sri Lanka in the years 411 to 413 AD, which was during the reign of King Mahānāma (c. 406–428 AD): “At the foot of the tree a shrine has been built, with the image of Buddha seated inside, an object of ceaseless worship to priests and laymen”.  The image seen by Faxian in the early 5th century cannot be the one installed at present in the Śrī Mahā Bodhi Shrine at the Mahāvihāra complex, dating earliest from the 6th century. Therefore it can be concluded that the present Buddha image was likely not the first one to be installed near the Bodhi tree, but possibly the first depicted with the gesture of touching the earth (bhūmisparśa-mudrā). Buddha of the Śrī Mahā Bodhi Shrine

Discoveries

Ruins of an ancient building called Mayura Pirivena (Mayura Monastery) have been found to the south-west of the Jaya Sri Maha Bodhi, and the ruins of a stupa called Dakkhina Tupa (Southern Monastery) can be seen nearby.

According to the ancient chronicles in Sri Lanka, some walls and terraces had been built surrounding the sacred tree at some time in the past.  Mahavamsa states that King Gothabhaya (249 – 262 AD) built a rubble wall. Dipavamsa reports that a rock-laid terrace and a lattice wall was built by King Kirthi Sri Meghavarna (302 - 330 AD).

During excavation for reconstructing the present wall, the rubble wall with its foundation created by King Gotabhya, and the rock-laid terrace together with a lattice wall constructed by King Kirthi Sri Meghavarna were found. These were preserved at place, and were opened to public in January 2010.

Incidents

Two branches of the sacred tree were broken during separate storms in 1907 and 1911.  An individual called Katuwawala Jamis, cut down a branch in 1929.  Liberation Tigers of Tamil Eelam shot and massacred a number of Sinhalese-Buddhists on the upper terrace in 1985. This incident is known as the Anuradhapura massacre.

Further reading
von Schroeder, Ulrich. 1990. Buddhist Sculptures of Sri Lanka. 752 pages with 1610 illustrations. (Hong Kong: Visual Dharma Publications): 22–23, fig. 1; 126–127, pl. 25G.
von Schroeder, Ulrich. 1992. The Golden Age of Sculpture in Sri Lanka. [Catalogue of the exhibition held at the Arthur M. Sackler Gallery, Washington, D. C., 1 November 1992 – 26 September 1993]. 160 pages with 64 illustrations. (Hong Kong: Visual Dharma Publications): 26, fig. 4.

See also
 Bodhi tree
 Buddhist pilgrimage
 Sanghamitta
 Anuradhapura massacre
 Mahabodhivamsa
 List of individual trees
 List of oldest trees

References

External links

Discover Sri Lanka - more information & images about Sri Maha Bodhi 
Living Heritage - Jaya Siri Maha Bodhi 
UNESCO World Heritage - Sacred City of Anuradhapura
Sri Maha Bodhi tourist site
The Bodhi Tree Network - Listing of branches/saplings of the Bodhi Tree around the world, cultivation tips of Bo tree, and how to share Bodhi trees
Buddha and the Bodhi tree

Buddhist pilgrimage sites in Sri Lanka
Buddhist temples in Anuradhapura
Individual trees in Sri Lanka
Archaeological protected monuments in Anuradhapura District
Individual fig trees
Oldest trees